Cashmere is the debut studio album by Swet Shop Boys. It was released via Customs on October 14, 2016. It peaked at number 45 on Billboards Top R&B/Hip-Hop Albums chart. Redinho handled the production, while rappers Heems and Riz MC shared vocal duties. Music videos were created for "T5", "Zayn Malik", and "Aaja".

Critical reception

At Metacritic, which assigns a weighted average score out of 100 to reviews from mainstream critics, the album received an average score of 80, based on 8 reviews, indicating "generally favorable reviews".

Chris Dart of Exclaim! wrote, "it's full of three-minute gems that get your head nodding and your brain working hard to parse multi-layered metaphors, and that stop when you're still wanting more." Tanner Smith of PopMatters described it as "an undeniably complicated but fun album that reckons with South Asian representation in the global pop culture of 2016."

It was placed at number 36 on NMEs "Albums of the Year 2016" list, number 24 on Rolling Stones "40 Best Rap Albums of 2016" list, and number 27 on Vices "100 Best Albums of 2016" list.

Track listing

Charts

References

External links
 

2016 debut albums
Swet Shop Boys albums